PFC Kyzyltash Bakhchisaray is an association football team based in Bakhchisaray, 
Crimea.

It was founded in 2016 in Yalta, where it remained one season. Positioned as the first Crimean Tatar football club. The unofficial anthem of the club is the national melody Yalyboyskaya Khaitarma.

Team names
Source:
 2016–2017: PFC Kyzyltash Yalta
 2017–present: PFC Kyzyltash Bakhchisaray

League and cup history (Crimea)
{|class="wikitable"
|-bgcolor="#efefef"
! Season
! Div.
! Pos.
! Pl.
! W
! D
! L
! GS
! GA
! P
!Domestic Cup
!colspan=2|Europe
!Notes
|- align=center bgcolor=LightCyan
|align=center|2016–17
|align=center|2nd Open Championship
|align=center bgcolor=tan|3/13
|align=center|23
|align=center|15
|align=center|1
|align=center|7
|align=center|51
|align=center|34
|align=center|46
|align=center| finals
|align=center|
|align=center|
|align=center bgcolor=lightgreen|Promoted
|-
|align=center|2017–18
|align=center|1st Premier League
|align=center|5/8
|align=center|28
|align=center|9
|align=center|5
|align=center|14
|align=center|39
|align=center|46
|align=center|32
|align=center| finals
|align=center|
|align=center|
|align=center|
|-
|align=center|2018–19
|align=center|1st Premier League
|align=center|6/8
|align=center|28
|align=center|9
|align=center|7
|align=center|12
|align=center|33
|align=center|38
|align=center|34
|align=center| finals
|align=center|
|align=center|
|align=center|
|-
|align=center|2019–20
|align=center|1st Premier League
|align=center|5/8
|align=center|28
|align=center|9
|align=center|7
|align=center|12
|align=center|49
|align=center|44
|align=center|34
|align=center| finals
|align=center|
|align=center|
|align=center|
|-
|align=center|2020–21
|align=center|1st Premier League
|align=center|7/8
|align=center|28
|align=center|8
|align=center|7
|align=center|13
|align=center|36
|align=center|47
|align=center|31
|align=center bgcolor=tan| finals
|align=center|
|align=center|
|align=center|1st–2nd league match (winner)
|-
|align=center|2021–22
|align=center|1st Premier League
|align=center|
|align=center|
|align=center|
|align=center|
|align=center|
|align=center|
|align=center|
|align=center|
|align=center|
|align=center|
|align=center|
|align=center|
|-
|}

References

External links
Official website 

 
Football clubs in Bakhchisaray
Association football clubs established in 2016
2016 establishments in Russia
Crimean Tatar organizations
Sports team relocations